"Pe-al nostru steag e scris Unire" is a Romanian patriotic song dedicated to the United Principalities of Moldavia and Wallachia established in 1859. Its tune is now used in the Albanian national anthem and allegedly in the anthem of the Dutch city of Maastricht.

The song was an official anthem for the Party of the Nation, established in June 1940 by King Carol II as the basis for his authoritarian regime. In 1975, after a national contest for a new anthem, Nicolae Ceaușescu made this song the national anthem of the Socialist Republic of Romania with lyrics modified by the Romanian Communist Party (PCR) to reference communism and title changed to "E scris pe tricolor Unire". However, since Albania already used the song since 1912, "Trei culori" ("Three colors") was adopted in 1977.

On 28 January 2016, Romanian journalist George Roca published an article stating that the anthem of the Dutch city of Maastricht had been copied from "Pe-al nostru steag e scris Unire". Mestreechs Volksleed, adopted in 2002, had a great similarity to the Romanian song, so Roca compared both songs and the Albanian anthem. He said that, unlike the Albanians which were proud of the Romanian origin of their anthem, the Dutch "stole" the hymn even though they blocked Romania from entering the Schengen Area for corruption claims. The controversy had a great impact on Romanian media, where news began to spread in several newspapers, as well as in Wikipedia. Months later, Roca declared satisfaction after seeing the effect that his article had had. Some residents of Maastricht have said this is just a coincidence and an article in the newspaper De Limburger explained that Mestreechs Volksleed originated from the closing song to the 1912 Dutch opera Trijn de Begijn, made by Alphonse Olterdissen (lyrics) and Guus Olterdissen (melody). It was also said that Olterdissen was unlikely to have been inspired by Romanian songs, as he used to use more nearby German and French ones. The similarities between the two songs have sparked fights on the Internet in which Romanians accuse Dutch people of having "stolen" the song even when Albanians "had the decency" of asking for it, while Dutch people reject these claims.

Lyrics

Original lyrics (1880)

Lyrics modified by the PCR
Nicolae Ceaușescu made the lyrics of this song the national anthem of Romania, but since Albania already used it, it was replaced in 1977.

The modified lyrics were the following:

Notes

References

External links

Socialist Republic of Romania
Historical national anthems
National symbols of Romania
European anthems
Romanian patriotic songs
1880 songs
National anthems
Romanian-language songs
National anthem compositions in G major